Sidabrinė gervė (Silver Crane) are the Lithuanian film industry awards for best actors, directors and films. The annual awards were presented from 2008 on by AVAKA (audiovizualinių kūrinių autorių teisių asociacija), the (national) Association for Author Rights of Audiovisual Artists.
In 2019 the Lithuanian Film Academy, which presented the awards, retired due bankruptcy. As a result the awards for that year were cancelled. Lithuanian film industry awards "Silver Crane" returned in 2020 and was held by the Audiovisual works copyright association AVAKA, which, after announcing the competition in 2019, acquired the rights to the „Silver Crane Award“.

Categories

Merit awards

 Best Film
 Best Director
 Best Actor
 Best Actress
 Best Supporting Actor 
 Best Supporting Actress
 Best Screenplay

 Best Documentary Feature
 Best Animated Feature
 Best Short Film
 Best Cinematography
 Best Score
 Best Art Direction
 Best Individual Achievement

Special awards
 Golden Egg for Best Student Film
 Golden Crane for Lifetime Achievement
 Audience Award

Irregular / Retired awards
 Best TV Film
 Best Co-Production
 Best Documentary Short
 Best Leading Performance
 Best Supporting Performance

Ceremonies

References

External links 
 Official Website
 Lithuanian Cinema Academy

 
2008 establishments in Lithuania